This is a list of submissions to the 64th Academy Awards for Best Foreign Language Film. The Academy Award for Best Foreign Language Film was created in 1956 by the Academy of Motion Picture Arts and Sciences to honour non-English-speaking films produced outside the United States. The award is handed out annually, and is accepted by the winning film's director, although it is considered an award for the submitting country as a whole. Countries are invited by the Academy to submit their best films for competition according to strict rules, with only one film being accepted from each country.

For the 64th Academy Awards, thirty-four films were submitted in the category Academy Award for Best Foreign Language Film. The five nominated films came from Czechoslovakia, Hong Kong, Iceland, Sweden and the eventual winner, Mediterraneo, from Italy. Hong Kong and Iceland received their first-ever nominations, while Czechoslovakia received its final nomination as a unified state.

Submissions
{|class="wikitable sortable" width="98%" style="background:#ffffff;"
|-
! Submitting country !! Film title used in nomination !! Original title !! Language(s) !! Director(s) !! Result
|-
|  || Cheb || Cheb|| French, Arabic || Rachid Bouchareb || 
|-
|  || The Tombs || Las tumbas|| Spanish || Javier Torre || 
|-
|  || I Love Vienna || I Love Vienna|| German, English, Italian, Polish, Persian, Arabic|| Houchang Allahyari || 
|-
|  || Toto the Hero || Toto le héros|| French || Jaco Van Dormael || 
|-
|  || The Well || Кладенецът (Kladenetzat)|| Bulgarian || Docho Bodzhakov || 
|-
|  || A Bullet in the Head|| A Bullet in the Head|| Imaginary language || Attila Bertalan || 
|-
|  || La Frontera || La frontera|| Spanish || Ricardo Larraín || 
|-
|  || The Spring Festival || 过年 (Guo nian)|| Mandarin || Huang Jianzhong || 
|-
|  || Confessing to Laura || Confesión a Laura|| Spanish || Jaime Osorio Gómez || 
|-
|  || Hello Hemingway || Hello Hemingway|| Spanish || Fernando Perez || 
|-
|  || The Elementary School || Obecná skola|| Czech || Jan Svěrák || 
|-
|  || The Great Day on the Beach || Den store badedag|| Danish || Stellan Olsson || 
|-
|  || Van Gogh || Van Gogh|| French || Maurice Pialat || 
|-
|  || Raise the Red Lantern || 大紅燈籠高高掛 (Dà Hóng Dēnglong Gāogāo Guà)|| Mandarin || Zhang Yimou || 
|-
|  || Brats || Félálom|| Hungarian || János Rózsa || 
|-
|  || Children of Nature || Börn náttúrunnar|| Icelandic, English|| Friðrik Þór Friðriksson || 
|-
|  || Henna || हिना (Henna)|| Hindi, Urdu || Randhir Kapoor || 
|-
|  || Beyond the Sea || מעבר לים (Me'ever Layam)|| Hebrew || Jacob Goldwasser || 
|-
|  || Mediterraneo || Mediterraneo|| Italian, English, Greek || Gabriele Salvatores || 
|-
|  || Rhapsody in August || 八月の狂詩曲 (Hachigatsu no kyōshikyoku)|| Japanese || Akira Kurosawa || 
|-
|  || Homework || La tarea|| Spanish || Jaime Humberto Hermosillo || 
|-
|  || Eline Vere || Eline Vere|| Dutch || Harry Kümel || 
|-
|  || Frida – Straight from the Heart || Frida - med hjertet i hånden|| Norwegian || Berit Nesheim || 
|-
|  || Alias 'La Gringa' || Alias 'La Gringa'''|| Spanish || Alberto Durant || 
|-
|  || The Double Life of Véronique || Podwójne życie Weroniki (La double vie de Véronique)|| Polish, French || Krzysztof Kieślowski || 
|-
|  || O Sangue || O Sangue|| Portuguese || Pedro Costa || 
|-
|  || Get Thee Out || Изыди! (Izydi!)|| Russian || Dmitriy Astrakhan || 
|-
|  || High Heels || Tacones lejanos|| Spanish || Pedro Almodóvar || 
|-
|  || The Ox || Oxen|| Swedish || Sven Nykvist || 
|-
|  || Der Berg || Der Berg|| Swiss German|| Markus Imhoof || 
|-
|  || A Brighter Summer Day || 牯嶺街少年殺人事件 (Gǔlǐng jiē shàonián shārén shìjiàn)|| Mandarin, Shanghainese, Taiwanese Hokkien|| Edward Yang || 
|-
|  || Lost in Siberia || Затерянный в Сибири (Zateryannyy v Sibiri)||  Russian || Alexander Mitta || 
|-
|  || Jericho || Jericó|| Spanish || Luis Alberto Lamata || 
|-
|  || The Original of the Forgery || Оригинал фалсификата (Original falsifikata)|| Serbian || Dragan Kresoja || 
|}

Notes

  Germany caused controversy when it took the unusual step not to submit any film to the competition. Europa, Europa by Agnieszka Holland was one of the pre-selection favorites to win the award. Although the film was made in German and about Germany, the country's National Film Board said that because they considered the film to be a majority-French production, and because the director was Polish, they did not consider it qualified to represent Germany. This is the only time since 1977 that Germany failed to be represented. 
  In spite of a rule requiring films to be in the language of the submitting country, AMPAS decided to accept a submission from the United Kingdom that was mostly in Russian, marking the UK's first-ever participation in the competition.
 AMPAS acknowledged that they had received four submissions from new Eastern European republics, Armenia, Croatia, Macedonia and Slovenia, which had each declared independence in mid-to-late 1991. Since none of the countries had yet been recognized internationally, the films were disqualified and not screened, although representatives from their parent states - the USSR and Yugoslavia - were allowed to compete. AMPAS did not announce the titles, but based on the small size of these republic's film industries at the time it appears certain that Macedonia chose Stole Popov's Tetoviranje, the most celebrated Yugoslavian film of 1991, and that Croatia, Slovenia and Armenia likely chose family drama Fragments, black comedy The Cartier Operation and surreal religious drama The Voice in the Wilderness'' respectively. 
 Other countries notable by their absence included Brazil, Egypt, Finland, Greece and Romania.

References

64